The 2009–10 season was the 121st season of competitive football by Celtic.

Celtic started their 2009–10 campaign by playing in the pre-season Wembley Cup. Their first competitive game of the season was at Celtic Park on 29 July where they were beaten 1–0 by Dynamo Moscow in the 1st leg of the Champions League third-qualifying round for best placed teams. However, in the return leg at Dynamo Stadium on 5 August, Celtic won 2–0 (2–1 on aggregate) thanks to a 44th-minute goal by Scott McDonald and a late injury-time strike from Georgios Samaras, giving Celtic a first away win in Europe since their 1–0 win over MTK Hungaria at Stadium Puskás Ferenc in 2003. The win took Celtic through to the Champions League play-off round, where they lost to Arsenal.

Celtic kicked off their Scottish Premier League campaign with a 3–1 win over Aberdeen at Pittodrie Stadium. After 30 games of the season, Tony Mowbray was sacked following Celtic's 4–0 loss to St Mirren, with Celtic 10 points behind league leaders Rangers. Neil Lennon was then appointed caretaker manager until the end of the season; his first match in charge was a 3–1 victory over Kilmarnock on 27 March. Lennon won all the remaining league games, but was unable to prevent Rangers from winning the league title.

Celtic lost their Scottish Cup semi-final against Ross County 2–0. This was Lennon's only defeat during his tenure as interim manager. After the end of the season, Lennon succeeded Tony Mowbray as the next Celtic manager on a permanent basis.

Results and fixtures
Fixtures and results for Celtic FC Season 2009/10.

Scottish Premier League

UEFA Champions League

UEFA Europa League

Scottish League Cup

Scottish Cup

Player statistics

Appearances and goals

List of squad players, including number of appearances by competition

|}

Top scorers

Team statistics

League table

UEFA Europa League squad

Technical staff

Transfers

In

Out

See also
 List of Celtic F.C. seasons

References

External links
Celtic FC
Celtic FC season 2009-10 ESPN Soccernet

2009-10
Scottish football clubs 2009–10 season